Daniel S. Swartz (December 23, 1934 or 1931 – April 3, 1997) was an American basketball player born  in Owingsville, Kentucky.

A 6'4" (1.93 m) forward from Morehead State University, Swartz played one season (1962-63) in the National Basketball Association as a member of the Boston Celtics.  He averaged 4.5 points per game and won an NBA Championship ring when the Celtics defeated the Los Angeles Lakers in the 1963 NBA Finals.

References

External links

1934 births
1997 deaths
Amateur Athletic Union men's basketball players
Basketball players at the 1959 Pan American Games
Basketball players from Kentucky
Boston Celtics players
Boston Celtics draft picks
Cleveland Pipers players
Kentucky Wildcats men's basketball players
Morehead State Eagles men's basketball players
Pan American Games gold medalists for the United States
Pan American Games medalists in basketball
American men's basketball players
Power forwards (basketball)
Medalists at the 1959 Pan American Games